Mioplosus is an extinct genus of percid fish that lived from the early to middle Eocene. Five species of the genus has been described, Mioplosus labracoides is found in the Green River Formation Lagerstätte. Mioplosus has numerous extant relatives in Northern Hemisphere fresh- and brackish water, as well as fossil relatives in Asia, Europe and New Zealand, and may be closely related to the modern-day Pike-perches (genus Sander).

Mioplosus are similar to modern Percids, and like them have two dorsal fins, the anterior dorsal fin spiny and the posterior soft-rayed.

Mioplosus have pointed teeth and are believed to have been voracious predators, individuals have been found with fish lodged in its throat. Mioplosus fossils are never found in large groups, which suggest they were solitary.

See also

 Prehistoric fish
 List of prehistoric bony fish
 Green River Formation

References

Percidae
Eocene fish
Eocene fish of North America